Marco Ngai Chun Kit (Traditional Chinese: 魏駿傑) is an actor in Hong Kong and has been in many TV series such as Flying Fox of Snowy Mountain 1997(or 98), To Catch the Uncatchable (2004) and one of the favourites, Armed Reaction series.

Personal life
He was married to Zhang Lihua, who is from mainland China. In 2010, Lihua gave birth to their daughter, Jessica. They divorced in 2020. He and TVB actress Joyce Tang broke up in 2007, ending their 9-year relationship.

Filmography

TV series
The Chord to Victory (1993)
The Legendary Ranger (1993)
Mind Our Own Business (1993)
The Condor Heroes Return (1993)
Journey of Love (1994)
Debts of a Life Time (1995)
Wars of Bribery (1996)
Food of Love (1996)
Mystery Files (1997)
Armed Reaction (1998)
Justice Sung II (1999)The Flying Fox of the Snowy Mountain 1999 (1999)Detective Investigation Files II (1999)The Legendary Four Aces (2000)Armed Reaction II (2000)Armed Reaction III (2001)Love is Beautiful (2002)Armed Reaction IV (2003)In the Realm of Fancy (2003)Riches and Stitches (2003)Perish in the Name of Love (2003)Split Second (2003)To Catch the Uncatchable (2004)The Prince's Shadow (2005)When Rules Turn Loose (2005)The Ultimate Crime Fighter (2007)Little Miss Unreasonable (2010)The Men of Justice (2010)

 Films Luxury Fantasy (2007)Once Upon a Chinese Classic (2010)Promise Time (2012)Show Hand'' (2014)

References

Living people
TVB actors
Alumni of The Hong Kong Academy for Performing Arts
Taiwanese male television actors
1967 births
People from Hsinchu
Taiwanese-born Hong Kong artists